Hendrik Streeck (born 7 August 1977 in Göttingen) is a German researcher of human immunodeficiency virus, epidemiologist and clinical trialist. He is professor of virology and the director of the Institute of Virology and HIV Research at the University Bonn.

Early life and education

Streeck studied medicine at the Charite University, Berlin. 
After his graduation he started to work as a postdoctoral fellow at the Ragon Institute of Massachusetts General Hospital, the Massachusetts Institute of Technology, and Harvard Medical School and obtained his PhD from the University of Bonn,  and part-time at the Partners AIDS Research Center, Massachusetts General Hospital and Harvard Medical School.

Career 
In 2009 Streeck was promoted to Instructor in Medicine and in 2011 to Assistant Professor at Harvard Medical School. In September 2012 he was recruited to the United States Military HIV Research Program, Bethesda, where he became the Chief of the Cellular Immunology Section as well as assistant professor at the Uniformed Services University of Health Sciences and adjunct faculty of the Bloomberg School of Public Health, Johns Hopkins University. In 2015 he became the chair for Medical Biology at the University Duisburg-Essen and founded the Institute for HIV Research in the same year, though he still maintains the status of "visiting scientist" with the US Military HIV Research Program.

In 2018, Streeck was appointed to the advisory board of the German AIDS Foundation (Deutsche AIDS Stiftung). In April 2020, he was appointed by Minister-President Armin Laschet of North Rhine-Westphalia to a 12-member expert group to advise on economic and social consequences of the COVID-19 pandemic in Germany.

HIV research
Under Streek's direction the Institute for HIV Research works on several prevention methods against HIV including the development and feasibility of HIV vaccines as well as pre-exposure prophylaxis. A particular focus for HIV vaccine development is to understand how T follicular helper (Tfh) cells can drive protective antibody responses during the germinal center reaction. Further research areas of the institute include understanding why some co-morbidities, such as cancer or cardiovascular diseases, are more prone to develop in chronic HIV infection and whether strategies can be developed to suppress HIV viral loads in the absence of antiretroviral therapy. Some of these studies are being performed in Maputo, Mozambique, where he leads a PhD sandwich program with the Instituto Nacionale de Saude to train and retain young physician scientists.

Sexually transmitted infections research
Streeck actively investigates the epidemiology, novel prevention and treatment options of other sexually transmitted infections. Currently, he conducts the largest systematic study for sexually transmitted infections in Germany, which seeks to understand who is becoming infected with which sexually transmitted infection.

In January 2019 the study was expanded to other European countries including France, Italy, Spain, Poland and Hungary under the name STIPnet study. In parallel, a European network to prevent human immunodeficiency virus and  sexually transmitted infections will be established. He has been nominated as the co-chair of International AIDS conference IAS 2021 in Berlin.

Coronavirus research
In early April 2020, Streeck and his team reported with reference to their COVID-19 Case-Cluster-Study that they had "carried out an intensive search of the home of a family infected with the coronavirus but found no trace of it on surfaces."

Streeck is accused by parts of the German media landscape of having presumably contributed to the poor course of the pandemic in Germany from October 2020 onwards through several misleading and false claims and conclusions that quickly gained traction in the German public.

Private life 
Streeck lives with his husband Paul Zubeil in Bonn.  Zubeil has been employed as a sub-department head for European and international affairs at the Federal Ministry of Health in Bonn since February 2021.

Awards 

 2015 – 15 HIV Advocates to Watch in 2015
 2014 – People Magazine “Sexiest Scientist” 2014
 2011 – Young Investigator Award, Collaborative AIDS Vaccine Discovery Bill and Melinda Gates Foundation
 2010 – Young Investigator Award, 17th CROI, San Francisco, CA
 2009 – Biennial German AIDS Award
 2009 – New Investigator Award, AIDS Vaccine Conference, Paris
 2009 – New Investigator Award, 16th CROI, Montreal, Canada
 2008 – Young Investigator Award, World AIDS Conference, Mexico City
 2008 – New Investigator Award, AIDS Vaccine Conference, Cape Town
 2008 – NIH Scholarship 2008, HIV-Vaccine, Keystone, Banff
 2008 – Young Investigator Award, 15th CROI, Boston, MA
 2007 – Young Investigator Award, 14th CROI, Los Angeles, CA
 2006 – Young Investigator Award, 13th CROI, Denver, CO
 2006 – Young Investigator Award, World AIDS Conference, Toronto
 2005 – Young Investigator Award, HIV-Pathogenesis, Keystone, Banff

Associations 

 American Society for Microbiology
 American Association of Immunologists
 German Association of University Professors (Deutscher Hochschulverband)

Works

Books/Chapters 

 H. Streeck, G. Alter: "Immune Responses to Viral Infections." In: D. D. Richman, J. Whitley, F. G. Hayden: Clinical virology. 4. edition. ASM Press, 2016,  
 H. Streeck: Bug Attack (The Adventures of Damien the CD4 Cell & his Friends).Band 1, . (A children's book for age 3–6 years, English)

Publications (selection) 

B. T. Schultz, A. F. Oster, F. Pissani, J. E. Teigler, G. Kranias, G. Alter, M. Marovich, M. A. Eller, U. Dittmer, M. L. Robb, J. H. Kim, N. L. Michael, D. Bolton, H. Streeck: "Circulating HIV-Specific Interleukin-21+CD4+ T Cells Represent Peripheral Tfh Cells with Antigen-Dependent Helper Functions." In: Immunity. 2016.
F. Pissani, H. Streeck:  "Emerging concepts on T follicular helper cell dynamics in HIV infection"  In: Trends in Immunology. 35(6), Jun 2014, S. 278–286.
S. Ranasinghe, S. Cutler, I. Davis, R. Lu, D. Z. Soghoian, Y. Qi, J. Sidney, G. Kranias, M. D. Flanders, M. Lindqvist, B. Kuhl, G. Alter, S. G. Deeks, B. D. Walker, X. Gao, A. Sette, M. Carrington, H. Streeck: "Association of HLA-DRB1-restricted CD4⁺T cell responses with HIV immune control."  In: Nature Medicine . 19(7), Jul 2013, S. 930–933.
M. Lindqvist, J. van Lunzen, D. Z. Soghoian, B. D. Kuhl, S. Ranasinghe, G. Kranias, M. D. Flanders, S. Cutler, N. Yudanin, M. I. Muller, I. Davis, D. Farber, P. Hartjen, F. Haag, G. Alter, J. Schulze zur Wiesch, H. Streeck: "Expansion of HIV-specific T follicular helper cells in chronic HIV infection" In: Journal of Clinical Investigation. 122(9), 4. Sep 2012, S. 3271–3280.
M. F. Chevalier, B. Jülg, A. Pyo, M. Flanders, S. Ranasinghe, D. Z. Soghoian, D. S. Kwon, J. Rychert, J. Lian, M. I. Muller, S. Cutler, E. McAndrew, H. Jessen, F. Pereyra, E. S. Rosenberg, M. Altfeld, B. D. Walker, H. Streeck: "HIV-1-specific interleukin-21+ CD4+ T cell responses contribute to durable viral control through the modulation of HIV-specific CD8+ T cell function." In: Journal of Virology. 85(2), Jan 2011, S. 733–741.
H. Streeck, B. Li, A. F. Poon, A. Schneidewind, A. D. Gladden, K. A. Power, D. Daskalakis, S. Bazner, R. Zuniga, C. Brander, E. S. Rosenberg, S. D. Frost, M. Altfeld, T. M. Allen: "Immune-driven recombination and loss of control after HIV superinfection" In: Journal of Experimental Medicine. 205(8), 4. Aug 2008, S. 1789–1796.

References 

1977 births
Living people
HIV/AIDS researchers
German epidemiologists
German virologists
German LGBT scientists
Physicians from Göttingen
Academic staff of the University of Duisburg-Essen
University of Bonn alumni
COVID-19 pandemic in Germany
Celebrity doctors